Basses Loaded is the 21st album by American rock band Melvins, released on June 3, 2016, through Ipecac Recordings. It features every member that has been a part of the Melvins over the previous decade, centered around the many bass guitar players to have passed through the band. Steven Shane McDonald of Redd Kross makes his debut with the Melvins, while Nirvana co-founder Krist Novoselic makes a guest appearance.

Nine songs from the album were previously released through Amphetamine Reptile Records on two limited edition EPs (Beer Hippy and War Pussy) and in a split-release with Le Butcherettes (Chaos as Usual). A version of the song "Choco Plumbing" appeared on the Cartoon Network program Uncle Grandpa in the episode "Uncle Melvins".

Track listing

Personnel
King Buzzo – guitar & vocals
Dale Crover – drums & vocals , bass 
Steven McDonald – bass & vocals 
Jared Warren – bass & vocals 
Coady Willis – drums & vocals 
Mike Dillard – drums & vocals 
Jeff Pinkus – bass 
Trevor Dunn – bass 
Krist Novoselic – bass & accordion 
with
Kristy Joy – backing vocals

Production
Toshi Kasai – engineer, producer
Mackie Osborne – art

References

Melvins albums
2016 albums
Ipecac Recordings albums
Sludge metal albums
Stoner rock albums